Samson Oni (born 25 June 1981) is a Nigerian-English high jumper.

Early in his career Oni won the 2001 AAA Indoor Championships while representing Nigeria. He also competed in the 2007 European Indoor Championships, the 2008 World Indoor Championships, and the 2009 European Indoor Championships without reaching the final. He then finished seventh at the 2010 World Indoor Championships.

His personal best jump is 2.30 meters, achieved in June 2008 in Birmingham, England. He has 2.31 meters on the indoor track, achieved in March 2010 in Banská Bystrica.  However, he achieved a personal best of 2.37 meters in practice before the Olympics.

References

1981 births
Living people
English people of Nigerian descent
English male high jumpers
Commonwealth Games competitors for England
Athletes (track and field) at the 2010 Commonwealth Games